Frontier Revenge is a 1948 American Western film written and directed by Ray Taylor and starring Lash LaRue and Al "Fuzzy" St. John. The film is a remake of Ray Taylor's Panamint's Bad Man (1938). Filmed at the Corriganville Movie Ranch, the film is neither set on a frontier nor is any revenge depicted. Extensive footage from this film was reused along with the return of Duce Rago in The Black Lash (1952).

Plot
Marshal Lash and Deputy Fuzzy impersonate an outlaw duo from Texas named the Dawsons in order to stop a series of robberies.  They are helped by a marshal's widow and an undercover government operator.

Cast
 Lash LaRue 	... 	U.S. Marshal Lash LaRue
 Al St. John 	... 	Fuzzy Q. Jones 
 Peggy Stewart 	.. 	Joan De Lysa
 Ray Bennett 	... 	Duce Rago 
 Jim Bannon 	... 	Brant 
 Sarah Padden ... 	Widow Owens
 Jimmy Martin 	... 	Pete  
George Chesebro 	... 	Colonel Winston
 Cliff Taylor 		... 	Bartender

References

External links

1948 films
American Western (genre) films
Remakes of American films
1948 Western (genre) films
Lippert Pictures films
American black-and-white films
Films directed by Ray Taylor
1940s English-language films
1940s American films